The Boeing XF6B-1 / XBFB-1 was Boeing's last biplane design for the United States Navy. Only the one prototype, Model 236, was ever built; although first flying in early 1933, it rammed into a crash barrier in 1936 and the design was not pursued further.

Design and development
Ordered by the U.S. Navy on 30 June 1931, the fighter aircraft was a derivative of the Boeing F4B; it was almost entirely of metal construction, with only the wings still fabric-covered. The aircraft was powered by a 625 hp Pratt & Whitney R-1535-44 Twin Wasp engine.

The intended role of this design turned out to be uncertain. While its rugged construction was capable of withstanding high g-forces, it weighed in at 3,704 pounds (700 pounds more than the F4B), and did not have the maneuverability needed in a fighter aircraft. It was, however, suitable as a fighter-bomber, and in March 1934 the prototype was redesignated XBFB-1 in recognition of its qualities. Even so, various ideas were tried to improve its fighter qualifications, such as an improved engine cowling, streamlining around the landing gear, and even a three-bladed propeller (two-bladed props being standard).

Operational history
Performance of the Boeing XF6B remained unsatisfactory with the U.S. Navy instead opting for the Curtiss F11C Goshawk.

Operators

United States Navy

Specifications

References

Citations

Bibliography

 The Illustrated Encyclopedia of Aircraft. London: Aerospace Publishing, 1965.
 Jones, Lloyd S. U.S. Naval Fighters. Fallbrook California: Aero Publishers, 1977, pp. 115–117. .
 Taylor, Michael J. H. Jane's Encyclopedia of Aviation. London: Studio Editions, 1989. .
 World Aircraft Information Files. London: Bright Star Publishing, 1985.

F6B
1930s United States fighter aircraft
Boeing BFB-01
Single-engined tractor aircraft
Carrier-based aircraft
Biplanes
Aircraft first flown in 1933